Blyth's frogmouth (Batrachostomus affinis) is a species of bird in the family Podargidae.
It lives in the tropical and subtropical moist broadleaf forests of Brunei, Cambodia, Indonesia, Laos, Malaysia, Myanmar, Thailand, and Vietnam, and feeds on invertebrates. It is sometimes considered conspecific with the Javan and Palawan frogmouths.

Characteristics 
This bird is typically only seen at nighttime in the lowlands and the lower forests, about to eight hundred meters. There are different characteristics to the male and the female birds. The males have a whitish lower belly with random white blotches on its breasts. The wings of the male also typically show extensive barring. The females are a warm brown, with the white blotches on the breast in the pattern of a necklace. The females also have a less wing barring than the males do. Both males and females' vocalizations give harsh nasal croaks. In addition to these croaks, the males also vocalize rippling clear whistles.

References

Batrachostomus
Birds described in 1847
Taxa named by Edward Blyth
Taxonomy articles created by Polbot
Taxobox binomials not recognized by IUCN